State Police is a 1938 American action film directed by John Rawlins and written by George Waggner. The film stars John 'Dusty' King, William Lundigan, Constance Moore, Larry J. Blake, J. Farrell MacDonald and David Oliver. The film was released on March 18, 1938, by Universal Pictures.

When his son is expelled from college, Colonel Clarke, head of the State Police, assigns him to the patrol of Sergeant Dan Prescott as Private Smith. "Smith" disobeys Dan's order and makes a play for his girl Helen Evans. During a shutdown of unprofitable coal mines at Minersburg, the gang of racketeer "Trigger" Magee levies tribute on the miners who are mining coal for their own use. Magee kills Albert Morgan for opposing him, and Dan gets order to arrest Magee and clean up the situation. "Smith" quits the force and becomes involved with the gangsters headquartered at "The Oaks," a notorious resort ran by Helen's brother Jack. The latter double-crosses Magee and is killed by him. Magee is arrested, escapes and makes "Smith" a prisoner and beats him unconscious for refusing to phone his father to call off the police hunt. Miners, led by Joe Palmer and Charlie, organize to clean out the gangsters while Dan's troopers are also closing in.

Cast        
John 'Dusty' King as Sgt. Dan Prescott 
William Lundigan as Pvt. Smith / Bill Clarke
Constance Moore as Helen Evans
Larry J. Blake as Trigger Magee
J. Farrell MacDonald as Charlie Wheeler 
David Oliver as Cpl. Duffy
Ted Osborne as Jack Evans 
Pierre Watkin as Col. C.B. Clarke
Guy Usher as Hughes
Charles C. Wilson as Capt. Halstead 
Eddy Waller as Const. Higgins
Sam Flint as Deputy Joe Palmer

References

External links
 

1938 films
American action films
1930s action films
Universal Pictures films
Films directed by John Rawlins
American black-and-white films
1930s English-language films
1930s American films